Gabriel Palacka (born 7. November 1960 in Komárno) is a Slovak politician, long term MP of the National Council, who shortly served as the Minister of Transportation from 1998 to 1999.

Early life 
Palacka studied computing at the Comenius University and the Slovak University of Technology in Bratislava. In the early 1990s, he worked as a consultant in advisory firm MESA 10 and pursued additional studies at the Georgetown University.

Political career 
In 1994 he became an MP of the National Council on the list of Christian Democratic Movement.In 1994 he shortly served as state secretary at the Ministry of Privatization in the technocratic government of Jozef Moravčík. In 1998 he became the Minister of Transport but had to soon resign due to corruption allegations associated with privatization of Slovak Telekom, auctioning of GSM 1800 licenses  and the operations of Slovak Airlines. He remained an MP until the end of his term in 2002. In 2003 he retired from politics to take a job at the European Bank for Reconstruction and Development.

References

People from Komárno
Slovak Democratic and Christian Union – Democratic Party politicians
Slovak Democratic Coalition politicians
Christian Democratic Movement politicians
Slovak politicians
Living people
1960 births
Comenius University alumni
Members of the National Council (Slovakia) 1994-1998
Members of the National Council (Slovakia) 1998-2002
Transport ministers of Slovakia